Sweden competed at the 2011 World Aquatics Championships in Shanghai, China between July 16 and 31, 2011.

Medalists

Diving

Sweden has qualified 5 athletes in diving.

Men

Women

Swimming

Sweden qualified 20 swimmers.

Men

Women

References

Nations at the 2011 World Aquatics Championships
Aqu
Sweden at the World Aquatics Championships